Libas Pur is a village in the north west district in Delhi, India.

References

Cities and towns in North West Delhi district